The Sun Life Building is a historic , 24-storey office building at 1155 Metcalfe Street on Dorchester Square in the city's downtown core of Montreal, Quebec, Canada.

The building was completed in 1931 after three stages of construction. It was built exclusively for the Sun Life Assurance Company of Canada. Although the then-new head office of the Royal Bank of Canada at 360 Saint Jacques Street in Montreal was taller by several floors, the Sun Life Building was at the time the largest building in square footage anywhere in the British Empire. The Sun Life Building went through three different stages of construction, the first one starting as early as 1913, but it was not until 1931 that its main 24-storey tower was erected, thus completing the project.

Construction 

The stages of construction were as follows:

 1913–1918: 7-story southern part of base;
 1923–1926: extension of base eastward and northward; and
 1929–1931: 16-story set-back tower.

Today, the "Sun Life" is Montreal's 17th tallest building and stands in the middle of the central business district centred on Dorchester Square, dwarfed by neighbouring Place Ville Marie and the nearby CIBC Tower.

Previous structure
The first Sun Life Building, designed by Buffalo architect Richard A. Waite, was built in 1889 and expanded by Robert Findlay in 1890. The red brick building was home to Sun Life until 1913, when the company moved to the first stage of the newer building.

Operation Fish
During the Second World War, during Operation Fish, Britain's gold reserves and negotiable foreign securities were secretly packed in crates labelled 'Fish' and shipped across the Atlantic Ocean to Canada. The securities, arriving at Halifax on July 1, 1940, were locked in an underground vault three stories beneath the Sun Life Building, guarded around the clock by the Royal Canadian Mounted Police. The gold was shipped on to Ottawa. The extremely secretive United Kingdom Security Deposit, operating in the vault, arranged for the sale of Britain's negotiable securities on the New York Stock Exchange over the next few years to pay for Britain's war expenses. The 5,000 Sun Life employees never knew what was stored away beneath them. None of the cargo went missing and no information about the operation was ever leaked.

See also
 Sun Life Centre
 List of old Canadian buildings (1809-1939)
 List of old Montreal buildings (1829-1939)

References

Rémillard, François, Old Montreal: A Walking Tour, Ministère des Affaires culturelles du Québec, 1992

External links
Official website

Darling and Pearson buildings
Skyscrapers in Montreal
History of Montreal
Office buildings completed in 1931
Beaux-Arts architecture in Canada
Skyscraper office buildings in Canada
Downtown Montreal
Headquarters in Canada
1931 establishments in Quebec